Subijana de Álava in Spanish or Subillana-Gasteiz in Basque is a village in Álava, Basque Country, Spain.

Populated places in Álava